This is a list of public holidays in Guatemala.

Public holidays
The Guatemalan Labor Code recognizes the following dates as public holidays with paid leave (unless marked as "Bank holiday"):

Dates of variable holidays

2020
April 9–11 – Holy Week
June 29 – Army Day
2021
April 1–3 – Holy Week
June 30 – Army Day
September 22 – September equinox
December 21 – December solstice
2022
March 20 – March equinox
April 14–16 – Holy Week
June 30 – Army Day
December 21 – December solstice
2023
March 20 – March equinox
April 6–8 – Holy Week
June 30 – Army Day
2024
March 28–30 – Holy Week
June 20 – June solstice
June 30 – Army Day
September 23 – September equinox

See also
 Holy Week processions in Guatemala

References

 
Guatemalan culture
Guatemala
Holidays